Nagahisa Kuroda (23 November 1916 – 26 February 2009) was a Japanese ornithologist.  He wrote several books on the birds of Japan and worked on Japanese encephalitis, the systematics of shearwaters, ducks and on avian anatomy.

Kuroda was the son of Japanese ornithologist Nagamichi Kuroda. He studied at Gakushuin High School and Tokyo University before receiving his doctorate from Hokkaido University where he worked on the systematics of shearwaters under Toru Uchida.  He worked briefly with the US Army medical unit 406 collaborating with Oliver L. Austin and then moved to the Yamashina Institute of Ornithology where he worked for the rest of his life. He took a special interest in the seabirds. He was an able artist and a violoncello player. He also wrote on avian anatomy, including notes on the pectoral, and cervical muscles.

A fossil species of shearwater Calonectris kurodai was named in his honour.

References

External links 
 Japanese ornithology and mammalogy during World War II : (an annotated bibliography)

Japanese ornithologists
1916 births
2009 deaths
20th-century Japanese zoologists